Parenting: Science and Practice is a quarterly peer-reviewed academic journal that covers research on parenting, caregiving, and childbearing and is published by Routledge. The editor-in-chief is Marc H. Bornstein.

Abstracting and indexing 
This journal is abstracted and indexed in:
 Current Contents/Social & Behavioral Sciences
 Social Sciences Citation Index
 Scopus
 Academic Search
 CINAHL
 TOC Premier
 CINAHL
 PsycINFO

According to the Journal Citation Reports, the journal has a 2013 impact factor of 1.065.

References

External links 
 

Taylor & Francis academic journals
Quarterly journals
Developmental psychology journals
English-language journals
Publications established in 2001